USS R-16 (SS-93) was an R-class coastal and harbor defense submarine of the United States Navy.

Construction and commissioning
R-16′s keel was laid down by the Union Iron Works in San Francisco, California, on 26 April 1917. She was launched on 15 December 1917, sponsored by Mrs. Edward R. Wilson, and commissioned on 5 August 1918.

Service history

1919–1931
Following commissioning, R-16 proceeded to Balboa, Panama Canal Zone, whence she conducted patrols until December 1918. Then ordered back to California, she remained on the United States West Coast into June 1919. On 17 June 1919 she got underway from San Francisco, California, and on 25 June 1919 arrived at Pearl Harbor in the Territory of Hawaii. Given hull classification symbol SS-93 on 17 July 1920, she operated with fleet units for the next 11 years.

R-16 departed Pearl Harbor on 12 December 1930 and, after transiting the Panama Canal, proceeded to Philadelphia, Pennsylvania, where she decommissioned on 12 May 1931. She was in reserve for the next nine years.

1940–1946
R-16 recommissioned on 1 July 1940 and by the end of 1940 had again assumed patrol duties in waters off Panama. Ordered back to the United States East Coast in the fall of 1941, she arrived at Key West, Florida, on 9 December 1941, two days after the Japanese attack on Pearl Harbor which brought the United States into World War II. By 18 December 1941, she was at New London, Connecticut, from which she conducted patrols and assisted in antisubmarine warfare training into February 1942. Shifted to the United States Virgin Islands in March 1942, she continued her dual mission in the Caribbean Sea, operating from St. Thomas in the U.S. Virgin Islands and from Trinidad. On 7 December 1942, the United States Army transport  mistook R-16 for a German U-boat and opened gunfire on her in the Caribbean Sea, but R-16 submerged and avoided damage.

On 1 March 1943, R-16 returned to New London. There she conducted operations for the submarine school, the sound laboratory, and  destroyer and destroyer escort training units. Between 1 August 1943 and 20 March 1944, she operated from Bermuda, then returned to New London for her last year of naval service.

R-16 departed New London for Philadelphia on 4 July 1945.  Arriving on 5 July 1945, she was decommissioned on 16 July 1945 and struck from the Naval Vessel Register on 25 July 1945. She was sold and delivered to the North American Smelting Company, Philadelphia, in March 1946.

References

Citations

Bibliography
 Hinman, Charles R., and Douglas E. Campbell. The Submarine Has No Friends: Friendly Fire Incidents Involving U.S. Submarines During World War II. Syneca Research Group, Inc., 2019. .

External links
 

R-16 (SS-93)
World War I submarines of the United States
World War II submarines of the United States
Ships built in San Francisco
1917 ships
Maritime incidents in December 1942
Friendly fire incidents of World War II